American singer and songwriter Pink has released nine studio albums, one live album, five video albums, six compilation albums, 55 singles, six promotional singles, and 51 music videos. Throughout her career, Pink has sold 60 million albums, 75 million singles and 2.4 million DVDs worldwide. According to RIAA, she has sold 18 million albums and 13.5 million digital singles. She is also UK's second best-selling female artist of the 21st century. Billboard ranked her as the fifth top female artist of the 2000s (13th overall), eighth top female artist of the 2010s (18th overall) and the 59th greatest artist of all time. Official Charts Company hailed her as UK's most played female artist of the 21st century.

In 2000, she released her debut studio album, Can't Take Me Home. It has sold four million units worldwide and yielded three singles, "There You Go", "Most Girls", and "You Make Me Sick". A year later, Pink recorded the Moulin Rouge! version of "Lady Marmalade" with Christina Aguilera, Mýa, and Lil' Kim. Later that year, Pink released her second studio album, Missundaztood, which has sold 15 million copies worldwide. The record was promoted by four singles, "Get the Party Started", "Don't Let Me Get Me", "Just Like a Pill", and "Family Portrait", all of which achieved commercial success.

In 2003, Pink released her third studio album, Try This. The album was her least successful album, having sold 3 million units worldwide. Its single releases include "Trouble", "God Is a DJ", and "Last to Know". Her fourth studio album, I'm Not Dead, was released in 2006 and fared moderately on the charts. It generated seven singles, including top 10 singles "Stupid Girls", "U + Ur Hand", and "Who Knew". Pink's fifth album, Funhouse (2008), sold over seven million copies worldwide and charted at number one in several countries, including Australia, the Netherlands, and the United Kingdom. It includes her second number one hit on the Billboard Hot 100, "So What".

In 2010, Pink released her first greatest hits album, Greatest Hits... So Far!!!. It produced two top 10 hit singles, "Raise Your Glass" and "Fuckin' Perfect". Her sixth album, The Truth About Love, was released in 2012 and produced six singles, "Blow Me (One Last Kiss)", "Try", "Just Give Me a Reason", "True Love", "Walk of Shame", and "Are We All We Are". In 2017, the singer released her seventh album Beautiful Trauma, which topped the charts in Australia, Austria, Canada, Ireland, the Netherlands, New Zealand, the United Kingdom, and the United States. Its lead single "What About Us" reached number one in Australia and the Netherlands.

Albums

Studio albums

Collaborative albums

Live albums

Compilation albums

Video albums

Singles

As lead artist

As featured artist

Promotional singles

Other charted songs

Other appearances

Songwriting credits

Music videos

See also
 List of best-selling albums in Australia
 You+Me duo with Dallas Green

Notes

References
General

 
 
 

Specific

External links

 Official website
 
 P!nk at Musicbrainz

Discography
Discographies of American artists
Pop music discographies
Rhythm and blues discographies

sv:Pink#Diskografi